David F. Propst House is a historic home located near Maiden, Catawba County, North Carolina. It was built about 1887, and is a two-story, single pile, brick, vernacular Late Victorian style dwelling.  It has an original one-story brick rear ell and a gable roof with boxed eaves.

It was listed on the National Register of Historic Places in 1990.

References

Houses on the National Register of Historic Places in North Carolina
Houses completed in 1887
Victorian architecture in North Carolina
Houses in Catawba County, North Carolina
National Register of Historic Places in Catawba County, North Carolina